Bundelkhand is a geographical and cultural region and a proposed state and also a mountain range in central & North India. The hilly region is now divided between the states of Uttar Pradesh and Madhya Pradesh, with the larger portion lying in the latter state.

Jhansi is the largest city in Bundelkhand. Another major city of Bundelkhand is Sagar being second largest city of Bundelkhand and headquarter of Sagar Division.

Etymology 

Bundelkhand means "Bundela domain". The region was earlier known as Jejabhukti or Jejakabhukti ("Jeja's province"). According to the inscriptions of the Chandela dynasty, this name derived from Jeja, the nickname of their ruler Jayashakti. However, it is possible that the name derives from an even earlier name of the region: "Jajhauti" or "Jijhoti". After the Bundelas replaced the Chandelas around 14th century, the region came to be known as Bundelkhand after them.

History

Under the British Raj, Bundelkhand included the princely states of Orchha, Datia and Samthar.

Proposed Bundelkhand state

Bundelkhand comprises parts of Uttar Pradesh and Madhya Pradesh. While Bahujan Samaj Party government under Mayawati had proposed in 2011 creation of Bundelkhand from seven districts of Uttar Pradesh, organizations such as Bundelkhand Akikrit Party and Bundelkhand Mukti Morcha (BMM) want it to include six districts from Madhya Pradesh as well. Uma Bharati of Bharatiya Janata Party has promised separate state of Bundelkhand within three years if her party voted to power, during campaign for Loksabha Election, 2014 at Jhansi. Similar promise was made by Congress leader Pradeep Jain Aditya during Loksabha Election, 2014.

Since the early 1960s there has been a movement for establishing a Bundelkhand state or promoting development of the region. Bundelkhand is geographically the central part of India covering some part of Madhya Pradesh and some part of Uttar Pradesh. (At Sagar is the exact centre of the original undivided India: the granite bench mark by British surveyors indicating this is placed in the compound of a church in Sagar Cantonment.) In spite of being rich in minerals, the people of Bundelkhand are very poor and the region is underdeveloped and underrepresented in state and central politics. There are several local parties and organisations, some promoting further development of the region and some seeking statehood. The agrarian crisis and farmers' suicides are also cited as reasons for separate statehood.

In November 2011 Uttar Pradesh Council of Ministers proposed to split the state into four parts, with one part being Bundelkhand.

Religion

Prominent Bundelis

Goswami Tulsidas, the author of Ramcharitmanas, born in Rajapur
 Keshavdas (1555 – 1617), usually known by the mononym Keshavdas or Keshavadasa, was a Sanskrit scholar & Hindi poet
 Tatya Tope, freedom fighter, fought in Indian Rebellion of 1857
Major Dhyanchand
Jhalkari Bai (22 November 1830 – 1858) was an Indian Koli woman soldier who played an important role in the Indian Rebellion of 1857 during the battle of Jhansi.

Maharaja Chhatrasal Chhatrasal Bundela was an early modern Indian Rajput king, who fought against the Mughal Empire, and established his own kingdom in Bundelkhand
 Rani Avantibai, (died 20 March 1858) Lodhi Queen of estate of Ramgarh, one of the key figures in the Indian Rebellion of 1857
 Rani Lakshmibai, (1828–1858) Maratha Queen of princely state of Jhansi, one of the key figures in the Indian Rebellion of 1857.
 Raghunath Vinayak Dhulekar MCA & Member of Parliament 1952, MLC &  Speaker Vidhan Parishad 1958, notable pleader, Social leader
 Mastani Second wife of Peshwa Bajirao I, the prime minister. Daughter of Maharaja Chhatrasal
 Saumitra Rawat, surgeon, chairman and head, Surgical Gastroenterology and Liver Transplant, Sir Ganga Ram Hospital, New Delhi; Bundelkhand Gaurav Samman, 2015 Padma Shri
 Maithili Sharan Gupt, National Hindi poet
 Pandit Nathuram Premi (1881–1960), Prominent publisher of Hindi, Sanskrit and Urdu literature as well as Jain literature. Independent scholar, Jain historian and editor of several Jain works. Founder of Hindi Granth Ratnakar Karyalay (24 September 1912), Manikacandra Digambara Jain Granthamala and Jain Hitaishi.
Phoolan Devi, (1963–2001) popularly known as "Bandit Queen", was an Indian dacoit and later a politician.
Uma Bharti, Prominent BJP politician and the former MLA from Charkhari in UP's Bundelkhand region.
 Dr. Hari Singh Gaur, Member of Constitution draft committee and founder of University of Sagar. The University of Sagar was later named the Dr. Hari Singh Gour University by the state government in 1983.
 Vrindavan Lal Verma, Hindi novelist (Mrig Nayani, Jhansi Ki Rani)
 Indeevar, one of the leading Hindi film lyricists in 1960s and 70s
 Rani Durgavati, Queen of Gondwana (born to Chandelas of Mahoba / Kalinjar) immortalised owing to her bravery in defending her kingdom against invasion by Mughal emperor Akbar
 Maharishi Mahesh Yogi, of Transcendental Meditation
Harishankar Parsai -  He was a noted satirist and humorist of modern Hindi literature and is known for his simple and direct style.
Rajneesh - Indian godman, mystic, and founder of the Rajneesh movement
Raja Bundela - Raja Bundela (Raja Rajeshwar Pratap Singh Judev) is an Indian actor, producer, politician and civil activist.
 Pankaj Mishra, Indian essayist and novelist
 Joy Mukherjee, Indian actor and director
 Ram Mukherjee, Indian director
 Sashadhar Mukherjee, producer of Hindi films
 Subodh Mukherjee, director, producer, writer of Hindi cinema.
 Subodh Khandekar, Olympian hockey player
 Tushar Khandekar, player on Indian national hockey team
 Gopal Bhargava, prominent BJP leader, Senior Most Legislator & Cabinet Minister of Madhya Pradesh

In Art and Literature

An engraving of a picture by Henry Melville entitled Scene near Chillah Tarah Ghaut, Bundelkhund was published in Fisher's Drawing Room Scrap Book, 1835 alongside a poetical illustration by Letitia Elizabeth Landon, Scene in Bundelkhund, which alludes to the desperate conditions in the district due to the famine then prevailing.

Gallery

See also
 Rajputana

References

External links

 Check dam project in Bundelkhand (Development Alternatives)
 Historic Blend, Frontline, Volume 24 – Issue 05 :: 10–23 March 2007
 James Foote Holcomb, Helen Harriet Howe Holcomb, In the Heart of India, or, beginnings of missionary work in Bundela Land, with a short chapter on the characteristics of Bundelkhand and its people, and four chapters of Jhansi history. Philadelphia: Westminster Press, 1905 Text at archive.org
 Radio Bundelkhand

 
Regions of Madhya Pradesh
Regions of Uttar Pradesh
Regions of India
Proposed states and union territories of India